David Lumsden may refer to:

David Lumsden (cricketer)
David Lumsden (musician) (1928–2023), choirmaster, organist and harpsichordist
David Gordon Allen d'Aldecamb Lumsden (1933–2008), Scottish businessman and nationalist
David Lumsden (poet) (born 1964), Australian poet, see Nocturnal Submissions
David Lumsden (actor), British actor, see Wild Geese II